Altenstein (German for "Old Rock" or "Old Stone") may refer to:

Places in Germany

Villages and administrative areas
 Amt Altenstein, an Amt in the Duchy of Saxe-Meiningen
 Altenstein, village in the municipality of Asbach, Rhineland-Palatinate, Germany
 Altenstein, village in the municipality of Häg-Ehrsberg in the county of Lörrach, Baden-Württemberg, Germany
 Altenstein, village in the market town of Maroldsweisach, county of Haßberge, Bavaria

Castles
 Altenstein Castle (Bad Liebenstein), historical castle site near Schweina and Bad Liebenstein, Wartburgkreis, Thuringia
 Altenstein Castle (Southern Black Forest), lost castle near Häg-Ehrsberg, Lörrach, Baden-Württemberg
 Altenstein Castle (Lower Franconia), castle ruins in Altenstein between Ebern and Maroldsweisach, Haßberge, Bavaria
 Altenstein Castle (Eichsfeld) in the vicinity of Asbach-Sickenberg near Bad Sooden-Allendorf, Eichsfeld, Thuringia
 Alte Burg (Altenstein), early medieval ringwork between Altenstein and Lichtenstein, Maroldsweisach, Haßberge, Bavaria
Ringwall Altenstein, lost castle near Taunusstein-Hahn, Rheingau-Taunus-Kreis, Hesse

Other places in Germany
 Altenstein (Bad Liebenstein), a quarter of Bad Liebenstein in Wartburgkreis, Thuringia, Germany, with the:
 Altensteiner Park
 Altenstein Palace

Other places
 Altenstein (Namibia), a municipality in Namibia

People
 Bernd Altenstein (born 1943), German sculptor
 Karl vom Stein zum Altenstein (1770−1840), Prussian politician